Björk or Björk as a book is a 192-page coffee table book published by the Icelandic singer and composer Björk Guðmundsdóttir (2001), designed by  M/M Paris.

Background
To coincide with the release of fifth studio album Vespertine (2001), Björk released a photo-book. The eponymous book has been created by Björk and has been edited and designed by celebrated Paris based design firm M/M (Paris) who, along with photographers Inez van Lamsweerde and Vinoodh Matadin, have also created the artwork for Vespertine and directed the video for the first single off the album, "Hidden Place". The photograph on the  rear cover of the book is an early test shot for the video. The book is non-chronological and all the images have been specifically chosen to illustrate this creative process.

The book is divided into 3 sections:

 Photography -  a series of photographs of Björk
 Words – text pieces, including an interview conducted by Björk with David Attenborough.
 Contributions ("Four Pages for Björk") – Björk asks her collaborators to contribute 4 pages to illustrate her belief that her public self is the result of many great and creative minds and not just a personal product.

The book features a dust jacket made in fabric. It has been designed as a transportable working manual rather than a traditional, hardback, coffee-table book.

Credits
Credits taken from M/M (Paris) website.

Contributions by

 Nobuyoshi Araki
 Martin Argles
 Jane Bown
 Comme des Garçons
 Anton Corbijn
 Hussein Chalayan
 Chris Cunningham
 Gabríela Friðriksdóttir
 Kate Garner
 Andrea Giacobbe
 Michel Gondry
 Haraldur Jonsson
 Irmelie Krekin
 Nick Knight
 Inez van Lamsweerde
 Vinoodh Matadin
 Glen Luchford
 M/M (Paris)
 Stefan Malzkorn

 Graham Massey
 Craig McDean
 Toby McFarlan Pond
 Me Company
 Jean-Baptiste Mondino
 Bjørn Opsahl
 Rankin
 Mark Ryden
 Jeremy Scott
 Stéphane Sednaoui
 David Sims
 Sjón
 Snorri Bros
 Stephen Sweet
 Juergen Teller
 Benni Valsson
 Lars von Trier
 Kevin Westenberg

Words by

Björk & Sir David Attenborough
 introduced by Jefferson Hack
Stéphanie Cohen
Philippe Parreno
Rick Poynorand
Won Tchoi

References

External links 

 The book's page on M/M Paris website
 Björk book special at bjork.com archive

Books by Björk
2001 non-fiction books
Music autobiographies
Coffee table books